Lady Charlotte Anne Santo Domingo (née Wellesley; 8 October 1990) is an English socialite and photography producer. Since 2016 she has consistently been listed in the annual Sunday Times Rich List.

Early life and family 
Lady Charlotte Wellesley was born at St Mary's Hospital, London on 8 October 1990 to Princess Antonia of Prussia and Charles Wellesley, Marquess of Douro. After the death of her paternal grandfather, Valerian Wellesley, 8th Duke of Wellington, in 2014, her father succeeded him as the 9th Duke of Wellington, the 9th Prince of Waterloo, the 9th Duke of Victoria, and the 10th Duke of Ciudad Rodrigo. As such, she is part of the British, Belgian, Dutch, Portuguese, and Spanish nobility. Her mother, Princess Antonia, is the youngest child of Prince Frederick of Prussia and Lady Brigid Guinness. Through her mother, Lady Charlotte is a great-great granddaughter of Wilhelm II, German Emperor and a great-great-great-great granddaughter of Queen Victoria. Lady Charlotte grew up at Stratfield Saye House, her family's estate in Hampshire. She is the younger sister of Arthur Wellesley, Earl of Mornington.

Education and career 
Lady Charlotte attended Wycombe Abbey, an all-girls boarding school in Buckinghamshire. She graduated in 2013 from the University of Oxford with a degree in archaeology and anthropology. While in university, she competed in the Fastnet Race, a yacht race organised by the Royal Ocean Racing Club.

Lady Charlotte works as a producer for fashion photographer Mario Testino in his London studio.

Personal life 
On 28 May 2016 Lady Charlotte married Colombian financier Alejandro Santo Domingo in a Catholic ceremony at the Church of the Incarnation in Illora, Spain. The reception was held at her family's Spanish estate, Dehesa Baja. King Juan Carlos I of Spain and Camilla, Duchess of Cornwall both attended the wedding.

The couple have two children, one born in 2017 and one in 2019.

She and her husband were ranked 29th in The Sunday Times 2017 Rich List, with an estimated fortune of  £3,682 million. She is one of the youngest people to have been featured on the list.

References 

Living people
1990 births
Alumni of the University of Oxford
Belgian nobility
Dutch nobility
Daughters of English dukes
English billionaires
English people of German descent
English producers
English socialites
People educated at Wycombe Abbey
Portuguese nobility
20th-century Spanish nobility
Charlotte
Charlotte
Women production designers
British production designers